Edward David Cartwright (15 July 1920 – 24 April 1997) was the tenth Suffragan Bishop of Southampton.

Cartwright was educated at Lincoln Grammar School and Selwyn College, Cambridge. Ordained in 1944, he began his career with a curacy in Boston, Lincolnshire and was then Vicar of St Leonard's, Redfield, Bristol. After that he held further incumbencies at Olveston, Bishopston and Sparsholt  and was then  Archdeacon of Winchester before appointment to the episcopate, a post he held from 1984 until 1989.

References

1920 births
Alumni of Selwyn College, Cambridge
Archdeacons of Winchester (ancient)
Bishops of Southampton
20th-century Church of England bishops
1997 deaths
People educated at Lincoln Grammar School